Na (hiragana: な, katakana: ナ) is one of the Japanese kana, which each represent one mora. The hiragana な is made in four strokes, the katakana ナ two. Both represent . な and ナ originate from the man'yōgana 奈. な is used as part of the okurigana for the plain negative forms of Japanese verbs, and several negative forms of adjectives.

Stroke order

Other communicative representations

 Full Braille representation

 Computer encodings

References

Specific kana